Genidens barbus, the white sea catfish or marine catfish, is a species of catfish in the family Ariidae. It was described by Bernard Germain de Lacépède in 1803, originally under the genus Pimelodus. It is an oceanodromous species that is found between the Río de la Plata Basin and eastern Brazil. It has been recorded spawning between the months of August–December. The maximum known life expectancy is 36 years.

References

Ariidae
Fish described in 1803